Linux Format is the UK's first Linux-specific magazine, and as of 2013 was the best-selling Linux title in the UK. It is also exported to many countries worldwide. It is published by Future plc (which produces a number of other computer magazines). Linux Format is commonly abbreviated to LXF, and issues are referred to with LXF as a prefix followed by the issue number (for example, LXF102 refers to the 102nd issue).

It began as a one-issue pilot in 1999 called Linux Answers, and began full publication as Linux Format in May 2000 after being launched and produced by a small team consisting of Editor Nick Veitch, Art Editor Chris Crookes and staff writer Richard Drummond, who together created the magazine's core values and initial design appearance.

Currently Linux Format has translated editions available in Italy, Greece and Russia. Many magazines are exported around the world, principally to the USA where they are sold in Barnes & Noble stores, as well as other large book stores.

Articles within Linux Format regularly feature at-length series and practical tutorials to teach and allow users to expand their skills in using the Linux operating system and its associated software applications. Contributions are encouraged to be submitted by readers.

Linux Format shares the UK market place with an English-language version of Linux Magazine and formerly with Linux User and Developer which discontinued in September 2018.

Contents 
Linux Format includes similar content to that found in most computer magazines, but aimed specifically at users of the Linux operating system. There are reviews, round-ups, technology features and tutorials aimed at all levels of users.

The magazine comes with a DVD containing full Linux distributions, and other free software.

Staff 
The magazine is currently edited by Neil Mohr with a team composed of Efraín Hernández-Mendoza as Art Editor, Jonni Bidwell as Technical Editor and Chris Thornett as Operations Editor. Previous staff members include Graham Morrison, Andrew Gregory, Mike Saunders and Ben Everard who went on to produce Linux Voice magazine (which later merged with Linux Magazine).

Frequency 
The magazine is published 13 times a year.

Online presence 
Linux Format has a dedicated magazine website which contains forums for readers to interact with the editorial staff and writers, as well as an extensive reference section for the articles in the magazine. In February 2009, the Linux Format editorial staff launched TuxRadar. TuxRadar has become the primary method of the editorial team getting Linux news on to the Internet, with the Linux Format webpage undergoing some modifications to become more community-focused.

See also 
 Linux Journal
 Linux Voice
 Linux User and Developer
 Linux Magazine

References

External links 

Linux Format

Computer magazines published in the United Kingdom
Linux magazines
Magazines established in 2000
2000 establishments in the United Kingdom